Europa Europa (lit., "Hitler Youth Salomon") is a 1990 historical war drama film directed by Agnieszka Holland, and starring Marco Hofschneider, Julie Delpy, Hanns Zischler, and André Wilms. It is based on the 1989 autobiography of Solomon Perel, a German Jewish boy who escaped the Holocaust by masquerading as a Nazi and joining the Hitler Youth. Perel himself appears briefly as "himself" in the film's finale. The film's title refers to World War II's division of continental Europe, resulting in a constant national shift of allegiances, identities, and front lines. The film is an international co-production between the German company CCC Film and companies in France and Poland.

The film is not to be confused with the 1991 Lars von Trier film Europa, which was released as Zentropa in the United States. Europa Europa won the Golden Globe Award for Best Foreign Language Film, and received an Academy Award nomination for Best Adapted Screenplay in 1992.

Plot
In 1938, in Germany, thirteen-year-old Solomon "Solek" Perel is taking a bath on the eve of his bar mitzvah when Kristallnacht occurs. Solek evades the Nazis, but returns home to find his sister Berta has been murdered. His father decides the Perel family will move to his birthplace of Łódź in central Poland, as he believes it will be safer there. Less than a year later, World War II begins, with the German invasion of Poland. Solek's family decides he and his brother Isaak should flee to Eastern Europe. Isaak and Solek head for the eastern border of Poland, only to find that the Soviets have invaded. The brothers are separated, and Solek ends up in a Soviet orphanage in Grodno with other Polish refugee children.

Solek lives in the orphanage for two years, where he joins the Komsomol, receives Communist education, and learns Russian. He takes a romantic interest in Inna, a young and attractive instructor who defends him when the authorities at school discover Solek's class origin is bourgeois. Zenek, a Polish Catholic boy whose father was captured by the Soviets, antagonizes Solek for being a Jew, and accuses him of being a Stalinist. Solek receives a letter from his parents informing him of their imprisonment in the Łódź Ghetto.

Solek is captured by German soldiers during the German invasion of the Soviet Union, and finds himself amongst a group of Soviet prisoners. As the German soldiers single out the Jews and commissars for execution, Solek hides his identity papers and tells the Germans he is "Josef Peters", a "Volksdeutscher" from a Baltic German family in Latvia. The soldiers deduce that "Josef" was in the orphanage because his parents were killed by the Soviets, and promise him vengeance. The unit adopts Solek as their interpreter, due to his fluency in German and Russian.

Solek avoids any public bathing or urinating, as his circumcised penis would expose him as a Jew. Robert, one of the soldiers, sneaks in on Solek while he bathes. Robert reveals he is homosexual, and promises solidarity to Solek, as both have secrets that the Nazis would kill them for. During combat, Robert is killed, and Solek, the lone survivor of his unit, attempts to reach the Soviet lines. As he crosses a bridge, the unit charges across behind him, and the Soviet troops surrender; Solek is hailed as a hero. The company commander decides to adopt Solek and send him to the elite Hitler Youth Academy in Braunschweig, to receive a Nazi education.

At the school, "Josef Peters" is introduced to the other boys as a heroic combat veteran. Solek manages to avoid baring himself through several methods, and attempts to disguise his circumcision with string and rubber bands to simulate a foreskin. During class, a Nazi "expert" in racial science uses Solek as a subject to determine his anthropometric indices, declaring him to be of "pure Aryan stock". Leni, a member of the Bund Deutscher Mädel who serves meals at the Academy, becomes infatuated with Solek. He returns Leni's affections, but does not consummate their relationship for fear of exposing himself. The two eventually part ways after Leni makes a violent anti-Semitic remark to Solek.

During his leave from the Academy, Solek travels to Łódź to find his family; however, the ghetto is sealed off and guarded by the Feldgendarmerie. Solek rides a tram that travels through the ghetto, observing horrific sights of tortured and starved people. He spots an elderly woman resembling his mother, but is unable to get closer to the woman. Later, Solek visits Leni's mother, who does not sympathize with the Nazis. She tells him Leni is pregnant by Solek's roommate, Gerd, and intends to give up the child to the "Lebensborn" program. When Leni's mother presses Josef on his identity, he breaks down and confesses he is Jewish; she tells him she had suspected, but promises not to betray him. He does not see Leni again.

Solek is summoned to the Gestapo offices, and is nearly exposed when he is prodded about his supposed parentage and is asked to show a "Certificate of Racial Purity". When Solek claims the certificate is in Grodno, the Gestapo official says he will send for it and then rants about how the war will be won by Hitler's "Wunderwaffen". As Solek leaves to meet with Gerd, the building is destroyed by Allied bombs; Solek's relief is tempered by Gerd's death in the bombing.

As Soviet troops close in on Berlin, the Hitler Youth are sent to the front-lines. Solek deserts his unit, and surrenders to the Soviets. His captors are initially doubtful that Solek is a Jew, and accuse him of being a traitor. When a Soviet officer angrily shows Solek photos of murdered Jews from death camps they liberated, Solek explains he was not aware of the extent of the death camps. They are about to have Solek shot by an elderly Communist political prisoner when Solek's brother Isaak, just released from a concentration camp, recognizes Solek. Isaak reveals to Solek that their parents were killed years prior when the Łódź Ghetto was "liquidated". Before leaving the camp, Isaak tells Solek to never reveal his story to anyone, saying it would never be believed. Shortly thereafter, Solek emigrates to the British Mandate of Palestine. The film ends with the real Solomon Perel, as an older man, singing a Jewish folk song taken from the Book of Psalms ("Hine Ma Tov," Psalm 133:1).

Cast

Release

Box office
The film was given a limited release in the United States on 28 June 1991, and grossed $31,433 in its opening weekend in two theaters. Its final international gross was US$5,575,738.

Reception 
Europa Europa received widespread acclaim from critics. On Rotten Tomatoes, the film has a score of 95%, based on 21 reviews. Writing for the Los Angeles Times, critic Michael Wilmington lauded the film's multi-faceted structure, calling Europa Europa "a tense suspense story, an ironic romance, and a truly black comedy — all driving toward a dark crisis of identity". In a positive review, Janet Maslin of The New York Times said it "accomplishes what every film about the Holocaust seeks to achieve: It brings new immediacy to the outrage by locating specific, wrenching details that transcend cliche".

Hal Hinson, of The Washington Post, praised the direction, saying "Holland isn't a dour moral instructor; she's an ironist with a deft ability to capture the absurd aspects of her material and keep them in balance with the tragic". Hinson commended the film for its "[awareness] of the toll [Solly's] shape-shifting compromises exacts". Desson Howe, also of The Post, was more critical, citing the film's "emotional distance", and, similarly to Maslin, said the film did not fully probe Solly's conscience.

Best Foreign Film controversy 
As it won four major "best foreign-language film" prizes from American critics' groups of the 1991 awards season, Europa Europa was strongly regarded as a contender for a Best Foreign Film Oscar for the 64th Academy Awards ceremony. However, the German Export Film Union, which oversaw the Oscar selection committee for German films, declined to submit the film for a nomination. The committee reasoned the film did not meet certain eligibility criteria, such as not qualifying as a German film. However, the film was a co-production between Germany, Poland, and France; in addition, much of the film is spoken in German, while the film's producer and much of the cast and crew is German. Export committee members reportedly called the film "junk" and "an embarrassment". The film's unconventional use of black comedy, as opposed to full tragedy, in a Holocaust film has been speculated to be a main cause for the committee's omission. The omission prompted leading German film-makers to write a public letter of support for the film and its director, Agnieszka Holland. The letter signees included Werner Herzog, Wolfgang Petersen, and Wim Wenders.

Despite the film's omission, it went on to be a critical and commercial success in the United States, where it became the second most successful German film, after 1981's Das Boot, and received an Academy Award nomination for Best Adapted Screenplay.

Accolades

Home media 
The film was released on DVD by MGM Home Entertainment on March 4, 2003. The Criterion Collection released a special edition Blu-ray of the film on July 9, 2019.

References

External links

Europa Europa: Border States an essay by Amy Taubin at the Criterion Collection
A Life Stranger Than the Movie, 'Europa, Europa,' Based on It an interview with Solomon Perel

1990 films
1990 LGBT-related films
Best Foreign Language Film Golden Globe winners
German coming-of-age drama films
German war drama films
Polish war drama films
French coming-of-age drama films
French war drama films
1990s German-language films
Holocaust films
Films about Nazi Germany
Films based on biographies
LGBT-related films based on actual events
Films directed by Agnieszka Holland
Films scored by Zbigniew Preisner
Films set in Germany
Films set in Łódź
Films set in the Soviet Union
Films set in Belarus
1990s Polish-language films
1990s war drama films
LGBT-related drama films
French LGBT-related films
German LGBT-related films
Polish LGBT-related films
1990 drama films
Biographical films about writers
World War II films based on actual events
German World War II films
French World War II films
Polish World War II films
1990 multilingual films
German multilingual films
Polish multilingual films
French multilingual films
1990s French films
1990s German films